Sugar cubes may refer to one of the following:

 Sugar cube, sugar pressed together in block shape that is used to sweeten drinks
 The Sugarcubes, a rock-pop band from Iceland
 A Cube of Sugar, a 2011 Iranian film